Toomas Tammaru (born 3 May 1968 in Tartu) is an Estonian lepidopterist and professor of entomology at the University of Tartu.

Together with Andro Truuverk and Erki Õunap, he transferred the butterfly Epirrita pulchraria to the genus Malacodea.

The butterfly (Manota toomasi Hippa & Kurina, 2012) is named after him.

He is the editor of the publication Lepinfo of the Estonian Naturalists' Society.

References

External links
 Home page

1968 births
Living people
Estonian entomologists
Estonian educators
University of Tartu alumni
Academic staff of the University of Tartu
Estonian editors
People from Tartu